Los Alpes is an affluent neighborhood located in the Álvaro Obregón borough of southwestern Mexico City. 

It is close to Barranca del Muerto, Periférico Sur, and Rómulo O'Farrill, among other important avenues of the city. The neighborhood started to flourish in the late 1950s, when many wealthy families started to build large houses around the area. 

After the Mexican early 1980s financial crisis, some families were forced to sell their residences. Architects and construction firms took advantage of the large lots and built premium condominiums and residences, including expansive family condos and luxury buildings with large apartments and penthouses. 

The neighborhood was home to Mexican president Felipe Calderón, until he moved to the official residence in Los Pinos.

References

Álvaro Obregón, Mexico City
Neighborhoods in Mexico City